María Milagros Véliz Pinto (born January 9, 1986, in Guacara, Carabobo state, Venezuela) is a beauty pageant titleholder who represented Venezuela in Miss World 2009, held on December 12, 2009 in Johannesburg, South Africa.  She was a finalist (top six) of the "Miss World Sports" fast-track competition.

Véliz, who stands 1.78 m (5'10") tall, competed in Miss Venezuela 2008, on September 10, 2008 and obtained the title of "Miss Venezuela Mundo".  She represented Anzoátegui state.

Véliz lives in London, United Kingdom, where she studies International Business at the European Business School London. She practices swim, Judo, high jump and other sports; and speaks Spanish, English, French and Italian.

References

External links
Miss Venezuela Official Website
Miss Venezuela La Nueva Era MB

1986 births
People from Carabobo
Miss Venezuela World winners
Miss World 2009 delegates
Living people
Venezuelan beauty pageant winners
Alumni of European Business School London